Lohmgraben is a small river of Bavaria, Germany. It is formed by the confluence of two small streams: Fahrbach and Grundgraben. It flows into the Aschaff near Aschaffenburg.

See also
List of rivers of Bavaria

Rivers of Bavaria
Rivers of the Spessart
Rivers of Germany